Agnocoris reclairei is a species of plant bug in the family Miridae.

Description

Habitat
The species live in white willows, and prefers wet areas. Can also be found in conifers, litter, and moss.

References

Insects described in 1949
Mirini